The following is a list of notable deaths in March 2007.

Entries for each day are listed alphabetically by surname. A typical entry lists information in the following sequence:
 Name, age, country of citizenship at birth, subsequent country of citizenship (if applicable), reason for notability, cause of death (if known), and reference.

March 2007

1
Manuel Bento, 58, Portuguese football goalkeeper (Portugal, S.L. Benfica), cardiac arrest.
Otto Brandenburg, 72, Danish singer and actor.
Colette Brosset, 85, French actress.
George Gabb, 79, Belizean artist, sculptor and writer, cardiac arrest.
Sir Sydney Gun-Munro, 90, Vincentian politician, Governor-General of Saint Vincent and the Grenadines (1979–1985), after long illness.
Tinos Rusere, 61, Zimbabwean Deputy Minister for Mines and Environment, kidney failure.
Bobby Speight, 76, American basketball player (NC State) and businessman, cancer.

2
Doris Anderson, 85, Canadian feminist, writer and editor of Chatelaine, pulmonary fibrosis.
Thomas S. Kleppe, 87, American Secretary of Interior (1975–1977), Representative from North Dakota, Alzheimer's disease.
Clem Labine, 80, American baseball pitcher (Brooklyn and LA Dodgers), complications of brain surgery.
Harold Michelson, 87, American production designer (Terms of Endearment, Star Trek: The Motion Picture, Planes, Trains & Automobiles).
Mike Mooney, 37, American football player with Georgia Tech and the 1993 San Diego Chargers.
Ivan Safronov, 51, Russian defence correspondent for Kommersant, fall from building.
William C. Sturtevant, 80, American Smithsonian Institution curator, emphysema.
Henri Troyat, 95, French writer and historian, member of the Académie française.

3
Osvaldo Cavandoli, 87, Italian cartoonist.
Jim Kaldis, 74, Australian politician.
Benito Lorenzi, 81, Italian football striker (Italy, Inter Milan).
Gene Oliver, 71, American baseball player in the 1960s, complications from lung surgery.
Türkan Rado, 91, Turkish writer, educator and jurist.
Saul Swimmer, 70, American documentary filmmaker (The Concert for Bangladesh), heart failure.
Marjabelle Young Stewart, 82, American etiquette authority and author, pneumonia.

4
Natalie Bodanya, 98, American operatic soprano.
H. E. Carter, 96, American biochemist.
Thomas Eagleton, 77, American Senator for Missouri (1969–1987), heart and respiratory complications.
Bob Hattoy, 56, American President of California Fish & Game Commission, AIDS activist, complications from AIDS.
Richard Joseph, 53, British video games soundtrack composer, lung cancer.
Sunil Kumar Mahato, 41, Indian parliamentarian, shot.
Tadeusz Nalepa, 63, Polish blues and rock singer, after long illness.
Robert Prince, 77, American composer.
John Thow, 57, American composer.
Renee Williams, 29, American heaviest woman in the world, heart attack.
Ian Wooldridge, 75, British sports journalist, cancer.

5
Alan Black, 64, British disc jockey.
Joseph H. Conlin, 79, American impresario and opera director.
Yvan Delporte, 78, Belgian editor-in-chief of Spirou magazine (1956–1968).
Milton N. Hopkins, 80, American ornithologist and farmer.
Ivo Lorscheiter, 79, Brazilian Catholic Bishop and advocate of liberation theology, multiple organ failure.
Ivan Supek, 91, Croatian scientist, philosopher and writer.

6
Jean Baudrillard, 77, French postmodernist philosopher and sociologist.
Allen Coage, 63, American-born Olympic judo bronze medalist and professional wrestler known as "Bad News Brown".
Ernest Gallo, 97, American co-founder of E & J Gallo Winery.
Pierre Moinot, 86, French novelist elected to Académie française.
Ray Stern, 74, American professional wrestler, complications from heart surgery.

7
Bill Chinnock, 59, American singer-songwriter.
Shane Cross, 20, Australian professional skateboarder, motorcycle collision.
Paul deLay, 55, American blues harmonica player, leukemia.
Frigyes Hidas, 78, Hungarian composer.
Emil Mailho, 97, American baseball player.
Morgan Mellish, 36, Australian Walkley Award-winning journalist for The Australian Financial Review, aircraft crash.
Neil North, 74, British actor.
Andy Sidaris, 76, American film director, throat cancer.
John Simpson, 79, British army officer, Director Special Forces.
Paul Sykes, 60, English heavyweight boxer.
Carla Thorneycroft, Baroness Thorneycroft, 93, Italian–born British philanthropist.
Billy Walkabout, 57, Cherokee-American highly decorated veteran of the Vietnam War, pneumonia and renal failure.

8
Taufik Cotran, 80, Palestinian-born British judge, Chief Justice of Belize (1986–1990).
Alejandro Cruz, 82, Mexican professional wrestler known as "The Black Shadow", pneumonia.
John Inman, 71, British actor (Are You Being Served?), hepatitis A.
Tom Moldvay, 58, American writer of Dungeons & Dragons books and modules (revised version of Palace of the Silver Princess).
Harold M. Ryan, 96, American politician, U.S. Representative from Michigan (1961–1965), congestive heart failure.
Richard Trexler, 74, American historian of the Florentine Renaissance, complications from a kidney transplant.
Viky Vanita, 59, Greek actress.
John Vukovich, 59, American baseball player and coach, brain tumor complications.
Christopher Barrios, Jr., 6, american murder victim, murder.

9
Rosy Afsari, 60, Bangladeshi film actress, kidney failure.
Brad Delp, 55, American lead singer of 1970s AOR band Boston, suicide by carbon monoxide poisoning.
Ron Evans, 67, Australian chairman of the AFL Commission, former Essendon chairman and player, abdominal cancer.
Glen Harmon, 86, Canadian ice hockey player.
Jack Kirby, 84, American football player.
Jeanne Hopkins Lucas, 71, American politician, first black woman to serve in the Senate of North Carolina.
Thomas B. Mason, 88, American attorney.
Ulpio Minucci, 89, Italian-born composer best known for work on Robotech, natural causes.
Juan Carlos Portantiero, 73, Argentine sociologist, renal failure.
Malaetasi Togafau, American Samoan Attorney General, judge and legislator, cancer.

10
Buddy Allin, 62, American golfer, winner of five PGA Tour events, cancer.
Francis Clark Howell, 82, American anthropologist.
Richard Jeni, 49, American comedian and actor (The Mask), apparent suicide by gunshot.
Ernie Ladd, 68, American NFL player and wrestler, cancer.
Lanna Saunders, 65, American soap opera actress (Days of Our Lives), multiple sclerosis.
Angela Webber, 52, Australian comedian and writer, cancer.

11
Dave Creedon, 87, Irish hurler (Cork), All-Ireland Champions (1952–1954), natural causes.
René Duhamel, 72, French Olympic rower.
Betty Hutton, 86, American singer/actress (The Miracle of Morgan's Creek), complications from colon cancer.
Martha Sosman, 56, American judge, member of the Massachusetts Supreme Judicial Court, breast cancer.

12
Arnold Drake, 83, American comic book writer (Doom Patrol, Deadman, Guardians of the Galaxy), pneumonia and septic shock.
Vilma Ebsen, 96, American actress, sister and dancing partner of Buddy Ebsen.
Jack Gaster, 99, British communist politician and solicitor.
Preah Maha Ghosananda, 77, Cambodian Buddhist Sangharaja and Nobel Peace Prize nominee.
Norm Larker, 76, American baseball player (Los Angeles Dodgers).
Juan Enrique Lira, 79, Chilean Olympic shooter.
Antonio Ortiz Mena, 99, Mexican Finance Secretary (1958–1970), IDB President (1971–1987), complications from a fall.
Yeap Ghim Guan, 66, Malaysian lawyer and politician, founding member of the DAP, complications from a stroke.

13
Herbert Fux, 79, Austrian actor and politician.
Terry Major-Ball, 74, British banker and author, brother of former Prime Minister John Major, cancer.
Wendy Russell Reves, 90, American philanthropist.
John Sinclair, 73, British English language scholar, cancer.
Arnold Skaaland, 82, American professional wrestler.
Nicole Stéphane, 83, French actress (Le Silence de la mer).

14
Lucie Aubrac, 94, French member of the Resistance during World War II.
Roger Beaufrand, 98, French Olympian, oldest Olympic champion at time of death.
Tommy Cavanagh, 78, British football player and manager of Burnley.
Lloyd Eaton, 88, American college football coach.
Sa'dun Hammadi, 76, Iraqi Prime Minister (1991), leukemia.
Fitzgerald "Mighty Terror" Henry, 86, Trinidadian calypso musician.
Gareth Hunt, 65, British actor (The New Avengers), pancreatic cancer.
Ron McEwin, 79, Australian footballer.
Birk Sproxton, 63, Canadian author (Phantom Lake: North of 54) and educator, heart attack.

15
Blanquita Amaro, 83, Cuban-born actress and dancer, heart attack.
Sally Clark, 42, British solicitor wrongly convicted of killing two of her sons.
Charles Harrelson, 68, American convicted murderer, heart attack.
Jay Kennedy, 50, American editor-in-chief of King Features Syndicate, drowning.
Bowie Kuhn, 80, American Major League Baseball commissioner (1969–1984), respiratory failure.
Orlando "Marty" Martínez, 65, Cuban-born American baseball player and manager.
Jack Metcalf, 79, American Republican Representative from Washington (1995–2001), complications of Alzheimer's disease.
Datuk Wira Poh Ah Tiam, 55, Malaysian politician, cancer and renal failure.
Stuart Rosenberg, 79, American film director (Cool Hand Luke, The Amityville Horror, The Pope of Greenwich Village), heart attack.
Herman Stein, 91, American film and television composer, heart failure.
Jean Talairach, 96, French psychiatrist and neurosurgeon.
William Watson, 89, British sinologist.
Dirk Wayenberg, 51, Belgian cyclist.
Ivan Welsh, 67, Australian politician, NSW MLA (1988–1991).

16
Sajjadul Hasan, 28, Bangladeshi domestic cricketer, motorcycle accident.
Pablo Emilio Madero, 85, Mexican politician, president of the National Action Party (1984–1987).
Sir Arthur Marshall, 103, British aviation engineer.
Steve McCooke, 88, British Olympic athlete.
Mou Zuoyun, 94, Chinese basketball player and coach (national team), President of the Chinese Basketball Association.
Raymond Nasher, 85, American art collector, founder of Nasher Sculpture Center, Nasher Museum of Art and NorthPark Center.
Manjural Islam Rana, 22, Bangladeshi national cricketer, motorcycle accident.
Carol Richards, 84, American singer and actress.
Tupper Saussy, 70, American composer, musician, author, and artist, heart attack.

17
John Backus, 82, American computer scientist who led the IBM team that developed Fortran.
Joseph C. Casdin, American businessman and politician, Mayor of Worcester, Massachusetts (1962–1963)
Crazy Ray, 76, American cheerleading fan of the Dallas Cowboys, diabetes and cardiovascular disease.
Jim Cronin, 55, American conservationist who founded Monkey World, liver cancer.
Freddie Francis, 89, English cinematographer (Sons and Lovers, Glory, The Elephant Man) and film director, Oscar winner (1961, 1990), stroke.
Homer Harris, 91, American athlete, first black captain of a Big Ten Conference team, Alzheimer's disease. 
Ernst Haefliger, 87, Swiss operatic tenor, heart failure.
Tanya Reinhart, 63, Israeli linguist and peace activist, stroke.
Ion Santo, 84, Romanian Olympic fencer.
John C. Williams, 65, New Zealand cricketer.

18
Jim Fung, 62, Hong Kong Chinese martial artist and businessman, nasopharyngeal carcinoma.
Bob Woolmer, 58, British cricketer for England (1975–1981) and Pakistan cricket team coach, heart failure.

19
Lloyd Best, 73, Trinidadian economist, politician and columnist, prostate cancer.
Giampaolo Calanchini, 70, Italian Olympic fencer.
Calvert DeForest, 85, American actor, comedian and David Letterman sidekick known as Larry "Bud" Melman.
Robert Dickson, 62, Canadian professor, award-winning Franco-Ontarian writer and poet, cancer.
Luther Ingram, 69, American R&B singer and songwriter ("(If Loving You Is Wrong) I Don't Want to Be Right"), kidney failure.
Elaine Shore, 79, American actress, tongue cancer.
Bill Stevenson, 55, Canadian football player, injuries from a fall.
Shimon Tzabar, 81, Israeli artist, author, poet and former Haaretz columnist, pneumonia.
Gemunu Wijesuriya, 72, Sri Lankan broadcaster and comedian.

20
Francis Agu, 42, Nigerian actor, complications from peptic ulcer.
Albert Baez, 94, American physicist and father of Joan Baez and Mimi Fariña, natural causes.
Olcott Deming, 98, American diplomat and first Ambassador to Uganda, sepsis.
Raynald Fréchette, 73, Canadian lawyer, Quebec Superior Court judge, National Assembly of Quebec member, cancer.
Rita Joe, 75, Canadian Mi'kmaq poet, Parkinson's disease.
Gilbert E. Patterson, 67, American bishop of Church of God in Christ, heart failure.
Taha Yassin Ramadan, 69, Iraqi politician and vice-president (1991–2003), execution by hanging.
John P. Ryan, 70, American actor (Runaway Train, Five Easy Pieces, Batman: Mask of the Phantasm), stroke.
Ernie Wright, 67, American football offensive lineman in the 1960s, cancer.
Hawa Yakubu, 59, Ghanaian politician, cancer.

21
Drew Hayes, 37, American comic book writer/artist (Poison Elves), heart attack.
Sven O. Høiby, 70, Norwegian journalist and father of Mette Marit, Crown Princess of Norway, lung cancer.
Mohd. Ayub Khan, c. 75, Indian politician.
Catherine Seipp, 49, American conservative columnist, lung cancer.

22
Nisar Bazmi, 83, Pakistani composer, kidney failure.
Don Dennis, 65, American pitcher for the St. Louis Cardinals in the 1960s, cancer.
U. G. Krishnamurti, 88, Indian philosopher.
Daniel Díaz Maynard, 73, Uruguayan politician, Deputy (1990–2005).
César Peñaranda, 91, Peruvian Olympic cyclist.
Jay Zeamer, Jr., 88, American World War II veteran and Medal of Honor recipient.

23
Ed Bailey, 75, American baseball player (1953–1966) and Knoxville, Tennessee city councilman (1983–1995), throat cancer.
Paul Cohen, 72, American mathematician, professor of mathematics at Stanford University.
Attila Kaszás, 47, Hungarian actor, stroke. 
Mao Anqing, 83, Chinese author and son of Mao Zedong.
Damian McDonald, 34, Australian Olympic cyclist, traffic accident.
Eric Medlen, 33, American NHRA driver, diffuse axonal injury from car accident.
Chase Nielsen, 90, American Air Force officer, participant in the Doolittle raid.
Robert E. Petersen, 80, American publisher of auto industry and enthusiast magazines, neuroendocrine cancer.
Walter Turnbull, 62, American founder of the Boys Choir of Harlem, stroke.

24
Jun Bernardino, 59, Philippine Basketball Association commissioner (1993–2002) and sports executive, heart attack.
Henson Cargill, 66, American country singer, complications from surgery.
Mary D. Crisp, 83, American Republican leader.
Maurice Flitcroft, 77, British amateur golfer and hoaxer, lung infection.
Jean Schwinden, 81, American former First Lady of Montana, wife of Ted Schwinden, cancer.
Martin Studach, 62, Swiss Olympic rower, heart failure.

25
George Kingsley Acquah, 65, Ghanaian Chief Justice from June 2003, cancer.
Robert Austrian, 90, American epidemiologist, stroke.
Jerry Girard, 74, American sports anchor for WPIX television in New York City, esophageal cancer.
Andranik Margaryan, 55, Armenian Prime Minister since 2000, heart attack.
Marshall Rogers, 57, American comic book artist (Batman, Doctor Strange, Silver Surfer), heart attack.

26
Beniamino Andreatta, 78, Italian economist and politician (Christian Democracy, Italian People's Party).
Cha Burns, 50, Scottish guitarist, lung cancer.
David Green, 85, American political adviser.
Heinz Schiller, 77, Swiss racing driver.
Sylvia Straus, 94, American pianist and widow of Rabbi Abraham Joshua Heschel.
Mikhail Ulyanov, 79, Russian actor, intestinal disease.

27
Hans Hedberg, 89, Swedish sculptor, kidney failure.
Paul Lauterbur, 77, American chemist and 2003 Nobel Prize Laureate.
Ransom A. Myers, 54, American-born Canadian fisheries biologist, declining fish stocks expert, brain tumour.
Raúl Meza Ontiveros, 40, Mexican suspected drug lord and high-ranking leader of the Sinaloa Cartel, shot.
Faustino Oramas, 95, Cuban singer (Buena Vista Social Club), cancer.
Aileen Plant, 52, Australian authority on infectious diseases, investigated first official case of SARS in Vietnam.
Joe Sentieri, 82, Italian singer and actor.
Charlotte Winters, 109, American veteran, last surviving American female veteran of World War I.

28
Cha Chi Ming, 93, Hong Kong businessman, founder and non-executive chairman of HKR International.
Abe Coleman, 101, Polish-born American professional wrestler during the Great Depression era.
Bill Fisk, 90, American football player and coach.
Sir Thomas Hetherington, 80, British lawyer, Director of Public Prosecutions (1977–1987).
Tony Scott, 85, American jazz clarinetist.
James Thorpe, 79, American politician, member of the Ohio House of Representatives (1967–1974).

29
Adebayo Adefarati, 76, Nigerian presidential candidate for the Alliance for Democracy party. 
Bangla Bhai, 37, Bangladeshi militant, execution by hanging.
Lloyd Brown, 105, American last known surviving World War I Navy veteran.
Juan Joya, 73, Peruvian footballer.
Mimi Lerner, 61, Polish-born American operatic mezzo-soprano, complications of a heart tumor.
Calvin Lockhart, 72, Bahamian actor, stroke
Myokyo-ni, 86, Austrian Buddhist nun, head of the Zen Centre in London.
Tosiwo Nakayama, 75, Micronesian politician, first President of the Federated States of Micronesia (1979–1987).
Shaykh Abdur Rahman, Bangladeshi Islamist militant leader (JMB) until his capture by the RAB, execution by hanging.
Leslie Waller, 83, American author.

30
Basil Catterns, 89, Australian WWII Army leader of the Kokoda Track campaign, father of broadcaster Angela Catterns.
Chrisye, 56, Indonesian musician, lung cancer.
Fay Coyle, 73, British footballer for Derry City, Nottingham Forest and Northern Ireland.
Michael Dibdin, 60, British crime writer.
Alfréd Fehérvári, 81, Hungarian football player and coach.
María Julia Hernández, 68, Salvadoran human rights activist, heart attack.
Ilias Kelesidis, 53, Greek Olympic cyclist.
Dave Martin, 72, British television writer for Doctor Who and Z-Cars, lung cancer.
John Roberts, 74, Canadian politician, heart attack.
DeForest Wheeler Trimingham, 87, Bermudian Olympic sailor

31
Patricia Barringer, 82, American baseball player (AAGPBL)
Phil Cordell, 59, British musician, 1971 hit as Springwater.
Thomas W. Moore, 88, American producer and president of ABC, heart failure.
Clarence Peaks, 71, American football player (Philadelphia Eagles, Pittsburgh Steelers).
Lito Sisnorio, 24, Filipino boxer, heart failure after surgery following a knockout.
Paul Watzlawick, 85, Austrian-born American psychologist and philosopher.

References 

2007-03
 03